The Cyprus mutiny took place on 14 August 1829 in Recherche Bay off the British penal settlement of Van Diemen's Land (now Tasmania, Australia). Convicts seized the brig  and sailed her to Canton, China, where they scuttled her and claimed to be castaways from another vessel. On the way, Cyprus visited Japan during the height of the period of severe Japanese restrictions on the entry of foreigners, the first ship from Australia to do so.

The mutineers were eventually captured. Two of them, George James Davis and William Watts, were hanged at Execution Dock, London on 16 December 1830, the last men hanged for piracy in Britain. Their leader, William Swallow, was never convicted of piracy because he convinced the British authorities that, as the only experienced sailor, he had been forced to remain onboard and coerced to navigate the ship. Swallow was instead sentenced to life on Van Diemen's Land for escaping, where he died four years later.

Swallow wrote an account of the voyage including the visit to Japan, but this part of the journey was generally dismissed as fantasy until 2017, when he was vindicated by an amateur historian's discovery that the account matched Japanese records of a "barbarian" ship flying a British flag whose origins had remained a mystery for 187 years.

Mutiny

On 6 August 1829, the brig Cyprus, a government-owned vessel used to transport goods, people, and convicts, set sail from Hobart Town for Macquarie Harbour Penal Station on a routine voyage carrying supplies and convicts under a guard commanded by Army Lt Carew. There were 62 people on board, including wives and children of some personnel, and 31 convicts.

On reaching Recherche Bay, isolated from the main settlement, the vessel was becalmed. Convicts allowed on deck attacked their guards and took control of the brig. The convicts marooned officers, soldiers, and convicts who did not join the mutiny in Recherche Bay, without supplies. They were saved by a convict called Popjoy who constructed a makeshift boat or coracle using only the three pocket-knives they had, and sailed to Partridge Island with Morgan, a free man, where they got help.

Pacific voyage

Nineteen convicts sailed away in Cyprus, having appointed one of their number, William Swallow, the only one with sailing experience, as sailing master. The mutineers first sailed to New Zealand, and then on to the Chatham Islands. There they plundered the schooner Samuel of the seal skins her crew had gathered. From the Islands, Cyprus sailed for Tahiti, but then changed destination to Tonga. The mutineers landed at Keppel's Island, where Ferguson, the leader, and six others decided to remain. Swallow then sailed to Japan.

Visit to Japan

Swallow wrote an account of the voyage which included a visit to Japan before reaching Canton; this was generally dismissed as fantasy. However, in 2017 this account was compared with Japanese records of an unwelcome visit by a British vessel off the town of Mugi, Tokushima on Shikoku in 1830, and matched in many points.

Makita Hamaguchi, a local samurai sent disguised as a fisherman to check the ship for weapons, wrote an account of the episode which included watercolour sketches of the ship and its crew. Another samurai chronicler called Hirota noted the crew offered gifts, including an object he later drew which has since been identified as a boomerang. The mutineers were desperately low on water, firewood, and supplies, but were attacked and sent away by the Japanese, in line with the isolationist policy of the time.

Warwick Hirst, former curator of manuscripts at the State Library of New South Wales, said that  there were "too many coincidences for it not to be true"; Takashi Tokuno, chief curator at the archive of Tokushima Prefecture, Japan, said there is a "high probability" the ship in Japanese records was Cyprus.

The second wife of Mangana

George Augustus Robinson, the overseer of the Aboriginal Establishment on nearby Bruny Island, wrote in his diary and in a report to Lieutenant-Governor George Arthur that the Cyprus’s guards had taken an Aboriginal Tasmanian woman into custody and on board at Recherche Bay, and that the convicts abducted her when they piratically seized the brig.  The woman was the second wife of Mangana, a Aboriginal chief and the father of Truganini’s by his first wife who was raped and murdered. 

 
Then as now, rape was considered a heinous crime and generally pirates codified against it in their articles, but still incidents were not uncommon. Therefore, rape cannot be ruled out as a possible motivation for the pirates taking Magana’s second wife. However,  the lack of sailors among the brig’s new convict pirate crew, only four with experience instead of the brig’s usual complement of 16 plus; their pending flight through the Roaring Forties, running the inevitable gauntlet of extratropical winter cyclones; and Aboriginal Tasmanian women’s reputation for swift acquisition of the two fundamental crewing skills of climbing a mast and tying a knot – they were adept tree climbers and basket weavers – gave the pirates an existential reason to abduct her. Indeed, even one of those four experienced convict crew members reported having been pressed by them into joining their escape.

It is odd that only Robinson and none of the Cyprus’s passengers, crew or guards reported Mangana's wife’s abduction. However, Arthur held sway over everyone on board. Someone sent letters to the Hobart Town Courier about the seizure but were not published. The narrative of the abduction seems to have been caught up in Arthur's secretly orchestrated diminution, genocide, of Aboriginal Tasmanians. An important element of this clandestine policy was the obfuscation of in-custody deaths, murders and abuses of Aboriginal Tasmanian women and children. This was politically important to Arhtur because William Wilberforce and the abolitionists had backed Arthur's posting to Van Diemen's Land as Lieutenant-Governor after he helped their cause in an 1823 Commons debate. In the debate, they had cited reports that Arthur had written in 1816 championing redress for women brutalised in slavery in British Honduras. If Arthur had reported the deaths, murders and abuses of Aboriginal Tasmanian women and children properly, it would have led to enhanced oversight of his administration or his recall. 

While the convict pirates were moored off Mugi Cove, in modern-day Tokushima Prefecture, Awa Domain spies documented the brig and reported to Hayami Zenzaemon, the Shogunate’s Feudal Overseer and Yamauchi Chūdayū and Mima Katsuzō, the two samurai Field Commanders.  An ink sketch by one of the spies shows a convict revealing a memorial portraiture tattoo of a woman with short-cropped hair: a style characteristic of and unique to Aboriginal Tasmanian women. The tattoo was revealed at first contact, the reveal was immediately followed by a circling glass toast and salute, and its wearer is portrayed with an expression of suppressed grief. These circumstances suggest that the bereavement was recent and had something to do with the pirates being there. The location of the tattoo suggests strong emotional attachment, the subject’s gender is stated in two manuscripts and her attire resembles that of the pirates. One of the pirates is reported as having become extremely agitated and abusive when they were told to leave immediately. 

Arthur's orchestrated diminution, genocide, created conditions that promoted contagions among the initially overseen and then interned Aboriginal Tasmanians , while repeatedly failing to provide the level of medical attention and/or supplies that were the norm on convict transports, in prisons and barracks at the time. Near synchronous infections and deaths were common among family members. Syphilis, despite being faster acting among Aboriginal Tasmanians, was the slowest of the pathogens taking months rather than days to kill and thereby resulting in near-synchronous deaths of weeks rather than hours apart. Mangana died of syphilis on 31 January 1830. The samurai spies had documented the memorial portraiture tattoo, its wearer’s expression of supressed grief, the toast, the salute, and an awful odour about the ship two weeks earlier on 16 January 1830.

East China Sea voyage

From Japan Cyprus sailed to the Ladrones. There four more of the mutineers left the ship. Swallow sailed on to Canton. Eventually, the mutineers scuttled Cyprus near Canton and claimed that they were castaways from another vessel. Swallow and three others worked their passage back to Britain aboard the East Indiaman Charles Grant. However, a man the mutineers had left in Canton confessed and by chance his account reached Britain a week before Swallow and his last three companions arrived there.

Trial

The mutineers were tried in London and two of them, George James Davis and William Watts, were hanged in that city at Execution Dock on 16 December 1830, the last men hanged for piracy in Britain. Swallow, and two others, were returned to Hobart, where another one named James Camm was hanged. Swallow died at the penal colony of Port Arthur.

Media

The mutiny is the subject of the Australian folk song Cyprus Brig. Simon Barnard's book Gaolbird: The True Story of William Swallow, Convict and Pirate, is a fictionalised account of the mutiny in which the mutineers are depicted as birds.

See also

Badger escape – Vandemonian convicts who stole a government-owned schooner in 1833 and sailed to Macau, China

Citations

References

Simon Barnard (2017) Gaolbird: The True Story of William Swallow, Convict and Pirate. .

External links
Australian Convict Pirates in Japan Evidence of 1830 Voyage Unearthed
"Seizure of the Cyprus" by Marcus Clarke
 Through Samurai eyes: shedding new light on Australia's greatest convict escape story ABC Radio, September 2019.
 Through Samurai Eyes: solving the mystery surrounding one of Australia's great convict escape stories. ABC Radio, September 2019.
 "Manuscripts relating to the January 1830 samurai repulse of the piratically seized Van Diemen’s Land colonial brig Cyprus from Mugi, Awa Province (Tokushima), Japan" Introduction, Supplementy Notes and translations by Nicholas Russell. Sponsored by the Austraila-Japan Foundaion. 2022 

August 1829 events
Convictism in Tasmania
Conflicts in 1829
Naval mutinies
Rebellions in Australia
Maritime incidents in September 1829